Pavel Benetka (26 January 1921 – 4 May 1997) was a Czech gymnast. He competed in eight events at the 1948 Summer Olympics.

References

1921 births
1997 deaths
Czech male artistic gymnasts
Olympic gymnasts of Czechoslovakia
Gymnasts at the 1948 Summer Olympics
Gymnasts from Prague